Thala aubryi is a species of small sea snail, marine gastropod mollusk in the family Costellariidae, the ribbed miters.

Description

Distribution

References

Costellariidae
Gastropods described in 2007